Tour of Azerbaijan 2011 is the 26th round of Tour of Iran (Azerbaijan), which took between 13 May and 18 May 2011 in Iranian Azerbaijan. The tour had 6 stages in which Mehdi Sohrabi from Iran won in first place in over all classification of the tour.

Stages of the tour

Overall classification

References

Tour of Azerbaijan (Iran)